Rodrigo Figueiredo de Carvalho (born 27 March 1996) is a Brazilian professional footballer who plays as a midfielder for Greek Super League 2 club Levadiakos.

Club career
Born in São Paulo, Figueiredo started his youth career with the academy of Red Bull Brasil, and joined the Corinthians academy in 2013. While at the junior team, he won the Copa São Paulo de Futebol Júnior and the Campeonato Paulista under-20.

Figueiredo was promoted to the senior squad at the end of 2016. On 5 June 2017, he signed a contract extension which would keep him at the club at till December 2019.

On 19 November 2017, Figueiredo made his senior professional debut for the club in a 3–0 defeat against Flamengo.

References

External links

1996 births
Living people
Association football midfielders
Brazilian footballers
Footballers from São Paulo
Campeonato Brasileiro Série A players
Sport Club Corinthians Paulista players
Londrina Esporte Clube players